= NS Railway =

NS Railway may refer to:

- Nederlandse Spoorwegen, railway operator in the Netherlands
- Norfolk Southern Railway in the United States
